The European Nations Cup returned in 2003, being the first tournament since England last won it in 1996. The last European Nations Cup held, in 1996, followed traditional structures presented from previous tournaments, involving just three nations, England, France and Wales, all teams only playing each other once. 

The 2003 tournament saw a revised structure, with Ireland, Scotland and Russia all joining. The new structure formed the basis of two groups of three, each nation playing a total of two games, where the winner of each group meets in a final. 

Pre-tournament favourites England easily won the final against France.

Group 1

Results

Final standings

France advanced to the final on points differential.

Group 2

Results

Final standings

England advanced to the final.

Final

References

External links
European Championship 2003 at rugbyleagueproject.org

European Nations Cup
European nations cup
European nations cup
European nations cup
European nations cup
European nations cup
European nations cup
European nations cup